Water polo competitions at the 2023 Pan American Games in Santiago, Chile are scheduled to be held from October 22 to 28. The venue for the competition is the Naval School Pool, located in Valparaíso. A total of eight men's and eight women's teams (each consisting up to 11 athletes) will compete in each tournament. This means a total of 176 athletes are scheduled to compete.

The top team in each tournament not already qualified for the 2024 Summer Olympics will qualify for the said event.

Qualification
A total of eight men's teams and eight women's team will qualify to compete at the games in each tournament. The host nation (Chile) qualified in each tournament, along with seven other teams in each tournament according to various criteria. Canada and the United States automatically qualified in each tournament, along with the top two teams at the 2022 South American Games and the top three teams at the 2023 Central American and Caribbean Games.

Men

Women

Participating nations
A total of five countries qualified water polo teams so far.

Medal summary

Medalists

References

water polo
2023
2023 in water polo
International water polo competitions hosted by Chile
Water polo at the 2023 Pan American Games